The 2011–12 Premier Academy League Under–18 season is the fifteenth edition since the establishment of The Premier Academy League, and the eighth under the current make-up.

All teams played the other teams in their group twice and play 10 inter-group fixtures, producing 28 games a season. Winners of each group qualify for the play-offs.

League tables
Updated as of 28 April 2012

Academy Group A

Academy Group B

Academy Group C

Academy Group D

Rules for classification: 1st points; 2nd goal difference; 3rd goals scoredPos = Position; Pld = Matches played; W = Matches won; D = Matches drawn; L = Matches lost; GF = Goals for; GA = Goals against; GD = Goal difference; Pts = PointsQ = Qualified for playoffs; C = Champions

See also 
 2011–12 Premier Reserve League
 2011–12 FA Youth Cup
 2011–12 Premier League
 2011–12 in English football

References

External links 
 Fixture and Results on official website

2011-12 Premier Academy League
Acad
Academy